The 1896 All-Ireland Senior Football Championship Final was the ninth All-Ireland Final and the deciding match of the 1896 All-Ireland Senior Football Championship, an inter-county Gaelic football tournament for the top teams in Ireland. 

Limerick were represented by the Commercials club with Young Irelands representing Dublin.

Bill Murphy scored Limerick's decisive goal, after which Limerick sat back to defend their lead. Limerick have not appeared in an All-Ireland football final since.

References

Final
All-Ireland Senior Football Championship Finals
Dublin county football team matches
Limerick county football team matches